Karina Bell (born Karen Gudrun Louise Hansen;  – ) was a Danish actress. She primarily worked as a film actress and was active from 1919 to 1933. Bell was credited in at least 21 Danish, German, and Swedish films during her career.

Life 
Karen Gudrun Louise Hansen was born on 26 September 1898 in Hellerup, Denmark. Her mother was named Anette Marie Hansen (1865–1928) and her father, Hans Peter Hansen (1856–1932), worked at Tuborg Brewery. In her early years, she attended Hellerup Kommuneskole and was a student at Emilie Valbom's ballet school. She studied under Emma Gad, who gave her the stage name, Karina Bell.

Bell made her debut in 1919 in the title role of "Tornerose" at Det Ny Teater. That same year, she began production on Carl Theodor Dreyer's film Leaves from Satan's Book, which premiered in 1921. She then acted in a large number of A. W. Sandberg's films, including David Copperfield (1922), Little Dorrit (1924), The Clown (1926), The Last Night (1928), and 5 raske piger (1933). She played in other theatrical productions during her career including Frøken Kirkemus at Betty Nansen Teatret.

On 26 May 1934 she married Knud Parkov (1894–1949), the director of Wiibroes Bryggeri in Helsingør. She stopped working as an actress once they were married. After he died on 20 January 1949, she took up a position on the board of Wiibroes Brewery, eventually becoming director as her husband had been. She died on 5 June 1979 in Helsingør and is buried beside her husband at Ordrup Cemetery.

Filmography

 En Ung Mands Väg (1919), directed by Carl Barcklind
 Helgeninderne (1921), directed by Benjamin Christensen
 Leaves from Satan's Book (1921)
 David Copperfield (1922)
 Paa Slaget 12 (1923), directed by A.W. Sandberg
 Den sidste Dans (1923), directed by A.W. Sandberg
 Kan Kvinder fejle? (1924), directed by A.W. Sandberg
 Kærlighedes-Øen (1924), directed by A.W. Sandberg
 Little Dorrit (1924)
 Wienerbarnet (1924), directed by A.W. Sandberg
 Min Ven privatdetektiven (1924), directed by A.W. Sandberg
 Morænen (1924), directed by A.W. Sandberg
 Fra Piazza del Popolo (1925; English: Mists of the Past), directed by A.W. Sandberg
 Maharajahens Yndlingshustru (1926), directed by A.W. Sandberg
 The Clown (1926)
 Revolutionsbryllup (1927), directed by A.W. Sandberg
 The Last Night (1928)
 Slangen (1928), directed by A.W. Sandberg
 Phantoms of Happiness (1929)
 5 raske piger (1933)
 Nyhavn 17 (1933), directed by George Schnéevoigt

References

External links

1898 births
1979 deaths
Danish film actresses
Danish silent film actresses
20th-century Danish actresses
People from Gentofte Municipality